Zeynep Heyzen Ateş (born 1980) is a Turkish translator best known for her translations of Chilean novelist Roberto Bolaño's 2666 and Amuleto from Spanish into Turkish.

Biography
Ateş, learned Spanish in Argentina, where she spent her childhood. Her first job was at OmMedya from 1998 to 1999 as the junior editor of Voyager magazine. Then she became one of the managing editors of Cordis Media Group. While there her first translation was Sushi For Beginners by the British novelist Marian Keyes.

She then worked at Radikal, before the demands on working on Bolaño's books became full-time. She remained invisible during all her career, saying that she was only an intermediary for the author. "Ideally, a translator is supposed to be invisible.  You’re not supposed to think about them, and typically it’s when you get to a clunky translation that you really notice them."

She has also translated Edgar Award-winner Stephen King's Mr. Mercedes, 11/22/63; Edgar Award-winner Neil Gaiman's Fragile Things; and Henning Mankell's The Man from Beijing. Her Gaiman translations are highly acclaimed by Turkish book critics.

Awards
Ates received the Umut Foundation Individual Disarmament Award in 2001.

References

Sources
 Biyografi.info - Zeynep Heyzen Ates

1980 births
Living people
Istanbul University alumni
Turkish translators
Turkish–English translators
Place of birth missing (living people)
20th-century Turkish women writers
20th-century Turkish writers
21st-century Turkish women writers